Harrah or Harrah's may refer to:

Places
Harrah, Fujairah, United Arab Emirates
 Harrah, Oklahoma, US
 Harrah, Washington, US
 Harrah, Yemen
 Harrah, or Harrat al-Sham, a region of rocky, basaltic desert straddling parts of Syria, Jordan, Israel and Saudi Arabia

People
 Dennis Harrah, a former NFL Offensive Lineman
 Roland Harrah III (1973-1995), American actor
 Toby Harrah, a professional baseball player
 Verna Harrah, philanthropist and film producer, widow of William F. Harrah
 William F. Harrah, founder of Harrah's Entertainment

Brands and enterprises
 Harrah's Entertainment, founded by William F. Harrah, later renamed Caesars Entertainment Corporation